Los Toros de Fucha was a Spanish language newspaper .

References

Spanish-language newspapers